Robert G. Clark is an American businessman who is the Executive Chairman and Founder of Clayco, a real estate development and design-build firm. Since 1984, Clayco has constructed nearly 200 million square feet of buildings. In 2020, Clayco did $3.8 billion in total revenue.

Clark grew up in Bridgeton, Missouri, and graduated from Parkway Central High School.

At age 13, Clark’s father bought him a book about building, and Clark recalls planning to work on only “big projects,” ambitiously assuming he’d only be constructing large buildings. One year later, an accidental gunshot injured Clark's eye, putting him in and out of the hospital for 10 months and requiring 15 operations. 

Following high school, Clark started a painting business and, at 19, became a partner in an equipment company. He later sold his stake and started a construction company in 1984. He did not finish college. Clayco is an architectural, design, engineering and construction firm. The company also offers real estate services such as site selection and land acquisition on behalf of its clients. By 2018, his company had more than 2,000 employees. 

Clark has advocated for greater diversity throughout companies' workforces and boardrooms. In 2021, he said that Clayco’s board of directors is getting more diversified and qualified. He has sought to promote diversity through mentoring employees and helping subcontractors who are MBE, WBE and from other historically disadvantaged groups grow their businesses.  

In 2019, Clark said the region's various economic development organizations should merge to avoid confusing and counterproductive actions. 

In 2021, Clark proposed to revitalize St. Louis’ downtown convention center, America’s Center, by demolishing it, including the Dome at America’s Center where the St. Louis Rams used to play, and building a new center parallel to North Broadway that would stretch for three blocks, from Convention Plaza on the south to Carr Street on the north end. Clark argues the plan would provide better access to residents north of downtown and a better facility for visitors.

Clayco and Clark have been supporters of vaccine mandates during the COVID-19 pandemic. In April 2021, Clark encouraged Chicago businesses to set deadlines for returning to the office and the city’s downtown corridor. As of September 2021, Clayco Construction required employees to get vaccinated or tested weekly, under President Biden's new federal plan for businesses with more than 100 workers.

Clark served as U.S. Commissioner General at Expo 2020 Dubai, the senior U.S. government representative, and head of delegation to the event. He and his team worked to publicize American values, innovation, and cultural diversity; invite visitors to study, travel, and invest in the United States; and push American positions on global issues like climate, space, food security, health, and innovation.

Affiliations

Civic

 Presidential appointment to the Committee for the Preservation of the White House
 Greater Chicago Food Depository Board of Directors (past)
 Member, Economic Club of Chicago
 Trustee, Construction Career Development Initiative

Business

 Member, Urban Land Institute (ULI)
 Member, Young Presidents Organization Chicago, St. Louis, Aspen (Past Chapter Chair St Louis)
 World Business Chicago
Chicagoland Chamber of Commerce

Educational

 Board of Trustees, University of Chicago Medical Center
Board of Trustees Position at University of Chicago Medical Center: In 2011, Bob Clark joined the Board of Trustees of the University of Chicago Medical Center.
Board Member, Central Institute for the Deaf (Past President of The Board)
 Scientific Advisory Council for Washington University School of Medicine in St. Louis
Saint Louis University Trustee (past)
 Trustee, Loyola University Chicago

Cultural

 Board Member, St. Louis Symphony Orchestra
 Board Member, Forest Park Forever
 Business Council of the Art Institute of Chicago

Philanthropy 
In 2016, Clark and Clayco’s company partners promised to give $4.1 million to Washington University in St. Louis School of Medicine  through the Clayco Foundation to advance research into RVCL, a rare blood vessel disease that results in death five to 10 years following diagnosis. 

The Savannah College of Art and Design renamed one of its building complexes for Clark after the Clayco Foundation gave money. The complex, now called Clark Hall, is listed on the National Register of Historic Places as a National Historic Landmark.

In 2021, the Clayco Foundation endowed a $500,000 scholarship in Penn State’s Department of Architectural Engineering to help make the student body more diverse and help full-time undergraduate students who have financial need.

Personal life 
Clark is married to Dr. Jane Clark; he has four children and eight grandchildren.

Awards & honors
Named Construction Man of the Year in 1997 and Entrepreneur of the Year by the AFL-CIO Building Trades Council of St. Louis
NAACP – Commitment to St. Louis – 2008
St. Louis Business Journal – Heroes of the Planet – 2008, Sustainable Communities Winner
 Focus St. Louis – What's Right with the Region Awards – 2007, for Improving Racial Equality and Social Justice
 St. Louis Business Journal – St. Louis Influentials – 2005 - 2011
March of Dimes – Building the Community Lifetime Achievement Award – 2003, for on-going commitment to the St. Louis community
 St. Louis Chapter of the American Jewish Committee - John D. Levy Human Relations Award – 2003, for leadership and commitment through volunteer activities that have improved human relations within the St. Louis region
Fast Company Award –  In 2021, Clayco was named among Fast Company’s Best Workplaces for Innovators. 
ENR 2021 Midwest Contractor of the Year – Clayco has also been named ENR 2021 Midwest Contractor of the Year, as well as #1 Top Developer and #1 Top Construction Companies on ENR’s Best of the Best List for 2021. 
Clayco is also #1 on the BDC Top 100 Design-Build Firms List.

External links 

 The Innovators: Clayco Executive Chairman Bob Clark

References

Living people
1959 births